The Indonesia women's national handball team is the national team of Indonesia. It is governed by the Indonesia Handball Association and takes part in international handball competitions.

External links
IHF profile

Women's national handball teams
Handball
National team